Kumawat is a caste clan of India.

Notable people bearing the name Kumawat

 Shobha Ram Kumawat (former Raj PCC Chief)
 M. L. Kumawat (former DG of BSF)
 Joraram Kumawat (MLA)
 Nirmal Kumawat (MLA)

References 

Indian castes